A judicator is someone who acts like a judge.

Judicator may also refer to:

 Judicator (comics), a Marvel character and an Elder of the Universe
 The Judicator caste, a faction of the Protoss race in the fictional Starcraft universe
 A warjack of the Protectorate of Menoth in the fictional Warmachine universe
 A playable class in Mechanical Dream
 Judicator (band), American power metal band
 A fictional weapon in the video game Metroid Prime Hunters

See also 

 1909 Judicator Act, which established the Supreme Court of Thailand
 Adjudicator